Roberto "Robbie" Reyes is a superhero appearing in American comic books published by Marvel Comics. He is the fifth Marvel character to use the name Ghost Rider, after Carter Slade (the Western comics hero later known as the Phantom Rider), Johnny Blaze, Danny Ketch and Alejandra Jones.

The character was portrayed by Gabriel Luna in the fourth season of the Marvel Cinematic Universe television series Agents of S.H.I.E.L.D.

Publication history
Robbie Reyes first appeared in All-New Ghost Rider #1 (March 2014), created by writer Felipe Smith and artist Tradd Moore.

When Marvel Comics was getting retooled as All-New, All-Different Marvel, editor Mark Paniccia approached writer Felipe Smith on creating a newer and younger Ghost Rider. Among Paniccia's suggestions were that this new Ghost Rider drive a car instead of a motorcycle, an idea that excited Smith. Another big difference between this Ghost Rider and its predecessors is that Reyes doesn't have a floating head, or a human skull, Smith says. "He's an amalgam of a flaming car and a human being. He's not wearing a helmet, and his head isn't a skull: this Ghost Rider is designed so his look simulates the lines of the classic muscle car he was racing the night he died." Tradd Moore was brought in to sketch ideas based on Smith's concept.

He also, more recently, appears on Ghost Rider (2016), Marvel Legacy and Avengers (2018) #1.

Fictional character biography

Robbie Reyes is a high-school student working as a mechanic at an auto body shop who lives with his developmentally disabled brother Gabe and seeks to get away from the dangerous, gang-riddled streets of East Los Angeles. To that end, he enters a street race, hoping to use the prize money to move themselves away. He is gunned down by mercenaries trying to retrieve pills that caused the transformation of Calvin Zabo into the supervillain Mr. Hyde, which had been left in the trunk of the 1969 Dodge Charger he "borrowed" from the auto body shop for the race. He is revived as a demonic being with a flaming, helmet-like head. He drives off in the car, now similarly ablaze.

Later, the spirit bound to the car introduces itself to Robbie as the ghost of a man named Eli Morrow, who says he had been killed by gang members. Eli offers to help Robbie clean up his neighborhood in exchange for Robbie helping him avenge his death. Robbie becomes a local hero whose fame catches the attention of Johnny Blaze, who travels to Los Angeles to confront the new Rider. Eli is later revealed as Robbie's estranged uncle, a Satanic serial killer who kidnapped and murdered at least thirty-seven people in rituals before being fatally shot by police in 1999. A possessed Robbie later encounters Johnny Blaze, who uses the Penance Stare on Eli's spirit.

Eli was also the one who pushed Robbie's mother down the stairs while she was pregnant with Gabe, causing Gabe's disabilities.

In addition to confronting Mr. Hyde and his criminal underworld, Robbie and Eli fight for dominance over Robbie's body. Robbie eventually permanently bonds with Eli and agrees to sate Eli's thirst for murder, but only by killing people with evil souls.

He appears in The Unbelievable Gwenpool along with Hawkeye, both working to stop a ceremony being held by dwarves using a mystical space rock. Gwenpool appeared in his trunk's portal via her friend Sarah "The Terrible Eye" and the police arrived, prompting them all to flee. He had claimed the gem with Gwen's ghost friend Cecil inside and left it in his car, where his possessing spirit was apparently attempting to turn Cecil on Gwen. When that fails he shrugs it off and decides to just go back to corrupting Robbie.

Following a vivid nightmare involving an ancient gathering of heroes that include a previous Ghost Rider, Robbie awakens in South Africa with no memory of how he got there. He is attacked by Star Brand, who seeks to keep him from finding a buried Celestial. Robbie defeats Star Brand by using the Penance Stare, an ability he previously had no idea he possessed, but somehow accidentally kills Star Brand as well.

Robbie then joins a new team of Avengers formed by Thor, Iron Man, and Captain America to fight off the Celestial Final Host. Sometime later, word of Star Brand's death somehow reaches Odin. The long-time ally of the original pre-historic Star Brand thought that Robbie killed the current Star Brand purposely. Robbie explains to the All-Father of Norse Gods about his accidental murder of the latter Star Brand when his Penance Stare first awakened, thus easily winning forgiveness and making friends.

In light of the threat caused by the Multiversal Masters of Evil, Ghost Rider travels the Multiverse with a Deathlok working for Avenger Prime that became his companion as they look to find allies to fight them. As they travel through the Multiverse, Ghost Rider and his Deathlok companion managed to get allies like Ant-Man of Earth-818, Star Panther, an assortment of Captain America variants, a Thor from Earth-56377 who wields the Iron Fist move, the Carol Corps, and different variants of Iron Man. On an alternate Earth, Ghost Rider, Deathlok, and Ant-Man of Earth-818 arrive on an alternate Earth to assist Captain Fury in fighting the Goblin Corps. With time being up, Ghost Rider, Deathlok, and Ant-Man of Earth-818 can finally head to the Avengers Tower at Infinity's End. Ghost Rider is contacted by the souls in his Hell Charger asking why he has forsaken them and that another Spirit of Vengeance has fallen. As Ant-Man of Earth-818 and Deathlok start to voice their concern, Ghost Rider uses his chains on them and drives off. When the Multiversal Masters of Evil have taken down another Earth while planning to return to Earth-616, Ghost Rider arrives where he uses his Symbiote control to disable Black Skull enough to subdue King Killmonger. Then he proceeded to use his Hell Charger to knock down Kid Thanos and Hound while having it drag Dark Phoenix. After subduing Ghost Goblin where his Noggin Bombs identify him as the All-Rider, Ghost Rider faces off against Doom Supreme who starts to overpower him. Deathlok and Ant-Man of Earth-818 arrive where Ant-Man of Earth-818 shrinks Doom Supreme to microscopic size. When Dark Phoenix goes on the attack, Deathlok instructs Ant-Man of Earth-818 to get Robbie away while he buys them time to get away. After Deathlok is slain, Doom Supreme states that they need to regroup before they visit where Ghost Rider and Ant-Man of Earth-818 have fled to. The Multiversal Masters of Evil will commit one more slaughter vowing that "No Avenger gets out alive".

Robbie Reyes and Ant-Man of Earth-818 arrive at the Avengers Tower in the Quarry of Creation where the Hell Charger drives into some of the attacking members of the Council of Red. Robbie states to Ant-Man of Earth-818 that he can't transform into Ghost Rider. Robbie Reyes was in the Avengers Tower at the time when Doom Supreme arrived at the God Quarry with Doom the Living Planet and the Doctor Doom variants that are loyal to him.

Powers and abilities
Robbie differs from previous Ghost Riders, mainly because he is not possessed by a Spirit of Vengeance or any similar demonic entity. Rather, he is possessed by the spirit of Eli Morrow, a deceased serial killing Satanist who worked for the Russian mob as a hit-man. Despite this, he has abilities similar to his predecessors; he possesses superhuman strength, speed, agility, stamina, and durability potent enough to challenge Thor or Captain Marvel, as well as the natural Rider's capability of conjuring natural and hellish flames. He wields a supernaturally strong chain weapon, and can banish people to Hell or outright consume their souls.

Unlike previous Ghost Riders who rode on motorcycles, Robbie drives a 1969 Dodge Charger R/T which he refers to as the Hell Charger. The Hell Charger is linked to the Ghost Rider, allowing Robbie in his Ghost Rider form to instantly teleport to and/or merge with the car. It also acts as a warp hub which he can shadowmeld with to warp things (himself or others) over varying distances using shadows. The Charger can also be driven remotely, and Robbie's Ghost Rider form can pass harmlessly through it, allowing it to drive into foes. The car's trunk, when opened, acts as a portal through Hell, allowing the Ghost Rider to transport anything, including people, to any location. Robbie, through his Hellcharger, can create portals out of hellfire to take himself anywhere he can think of while Eli can change the shape and appearance of their ride. Eli is shown to able to take control of Robbie's body whenever he feels that he isn't up to the task or when Robbie gives into negative emotion, which is signified in his human form by a pallid skin tone and his eyes turning orange. The vehicle can also contact the spirits of the deceased as it was able to enlist the aid of Tony's dead father Howard Stark to ask for information.

During his battle with Star Brand, Robbie discovers that he possesses the Penance Stare, which allows him to force anyone who makes eye contact with him to experience all of the pain and suffering they have ever inflicted on others. His Ghost Rider form can also evolve into a stronger, more demonic form when Robbie is sufficiently angered, though this transformation is harder to control and more destructive. Recently while battling corrupted Celestial's Robbie later realized he'd entrenched a simple tractor with his rider properties. Similarly to Daniel Ketch; Robbie's rider transformation changes everything within reach alongside him as well.

Other versions

Heroes Reborn
In an alternate universe depicted in the miniseries Heroes Reborn, Robbie Reyes never became Ghost Rider and instead lived a normal life.

Secret Wars
During the 2015 "Secret Wars" storyline, a variation of Robbie and his brother Gabe live south of Doomstadt on Battleworld. The former and several of his friends are arrested by the Thor Corps when patrol bots discover that Robbie possesses an "igniter spirit", taken to the Killiseum, and forced to participate in Arcade's Ghost Races. Dubbed "The Hell-Charger" to distinguish himself from other Ghost Riders, Robbie loses his first race, but makes a deal with his spirit Eli to win every race onward, becoming popular with audiences. Robbie later kills a monster that was created using his friends. Realizing the severity of his new life, Robbie escapes as Eli could not be controlled by Zadkiel. When Robbie discovers that Gabe was kidnapped by Arcade, he is forced to race in the races. Robbie returns to the Killiseum, where he defeats Zadkiel and frees the other racers. Afterwards, Eli kills Arcade and the Ghost Riders decide to become the Spirits of Vengeance.

Venomverse
An alternate universe version of Robbie possessed by Eli and Venom calling himself Host Rider appears in the 2017 Venomverse storyline. Due to Eli and Venom uniting against him, Robbie became a puppet. Host Rider is recruited by a "Venomized" Doctor Strange to join an army of Venoms to defeat a species capable of taking over symbiotes and their hosts called Poisons. While Host Rider is assimilated by the Poisons, they are killed by an alternate universe version of Carnage.

In other media

Television
 Robbie Reyes appears as a recurring character in the fourth season of the Marvel Cinematic Universe series Agents of S.H.I.E.L.D., portrayed by Gabriel Luna. This version gained his powers after he and his brother, Gabe, were attacked by a street gang called the Fifth Street Locos, who mistook Robbie for his uncle Eli Morrow. Gabe is paralyzed while Robbie's injuries are fatal. However, a "good Samaritan", Johnny Blaze / Ghost Rider, rescues Gabe and revives Robbie by giving him the spirit of vengeance. As Robbie only saw Johnny in his Ghost Rider form, the former believes that he sold his soul to "The Devil" and goes on to hunt down and kill members of the Fifth Street Locos as well as other people he believes "deserve it". He later comes into conflict with rogue S.H.I.E.L.D. agent Daisy Johnson, but eventually allies himself with her and S.H.I.E.L.D. to combat Morrow's former coworker turned ghost, Lucy Bauer, and others like her after discovering he is capable of exorcising them before confronting Morrow over his crimes and dragging him into another dimension. Months later, Reyes returns to help the S.H.I.E.L.D. agents defeat AIDA and her LMDs before taking the Darkhold and leaving to find a place to hide it.
 In October 2016, Luna discussed plans for Reyes to feature in his own television series following his introduction in Agents of S.H.I.E.L.D. In later interviews, the actor stated he hopes Norman Reedus would portray Johnny Blaze in the Marvel Cinematic Universe. On May 1, 2019, it was announced that a television series based on Robbie Reyes's incarnation of Ghost Rider would have premiered on Hulu in 2020, with Luna reprising his role. On September 25, 2019 however, Deadline reported that the series was no longer moving forward. Hulu cited this happened due to a "creative impasse", but will potentially shop it around.

Video games
 Robbie Reyes / Ghost Rider appeared as a "team-up" character in Marvel Heroes.
 Robbie Reyes / Ghost Rider appeared as a playable character in Marvel Avengers Academy.
 Robbie Reyes / Ghost Rider appears as a playable character in Marvel: Future Fight.
 Robbie Reyes / Ghost Rider appears an NPC and character summon in Marvel Future Revolution.
 Robbie Reyes / Ghost Rider appears as a playable character in Marvel's Midnight Suns, voiced by Giancarlo Sabogal and Darin De Paul respectively. This version is a member of the Midnight Suns.

Motion comics
 Robbie Reyes appears in War of the Realms: Marvel Ultimate Comics, voiced by Edwin Perez.

Collected editions

References

External links
 Ghost Rider (Robbie Reyes) at the Marvel Wiki
 Ghost Rider (Robbie Reyes) at Comic Vine
 How Agents of S.H.I.E.L.D. Changes Robbie Reyes/Ghost Rider's Origin Story
 Felipe Smith & Tradd Moore Join This Week in Marvel's Agents of S.H.I.E.L.D.

Avengers (comics) characters
Comics characters introduced in 2014
Marvel Comics characters who can move at superhuman speeds
Marvel Comics characters who can teleport
Marvel Comics characters with accelerated healing
Marvel Comics characters with superhuman strength
Marvel Comics demons
Marvel Comics male superheroes
Marvel Comics television characters
Merged fictional characters
Mexican superheroes
Fictional characters from Los Angeles
Fictional characters with fire or heat abilities
Fictional characters with heterochromia
Fictional characters with immortality
Fictional characters with superhuman durability or invulnerability
Fictional chain fighters
Fictional mechanics
Fictional skeletons
Reyes, Robbie
Mythology in Marvel Comics
Fictional drivers
Vigilante characters in comics